Chiana-Paga is one of the constituencies represented in the Parliament of Ghana. It elects one Member of Parliament (MP) by the first past the post system of election. Chiana-Paga is in the Kassena/Nankana district  of the Upper East Region of Ghana.

Boundaries
The seat is located within the Kassena/Nankana District in the Upper East Region of Ghana.

Members of Parliament

Elections

See also
List of Ghana Parliament constituencies

References 

Parliamentary constituencies in the Upper East Region